Poza de la Sal is a municipality and town located in the province of Burgos, Castile and León, Spain. According to the 2004 census (INE), the municipality has a population of 387 inhabitants.

Main sights 

 Rojas castle (9th-15th century)
 Salt evaporation ponds and Diapir - Salt extraction since the Ancient Rome times. The Diapir is the biggest one in Europe.
 San Cosme y San Damián church (14th-18th century)

People from Poza de la Sal 
 Félix Rodríguez de la Fuente (1928-1980) - Broadcaster and naturalist, best known for the highly successful and influential TV series El Hombre y la Tierra.

References

External links 

 http://pozadelasalcultura.blogspot.com.es/

Municipalities in the Province of Burgos